The International Society for Magnetic Resonance in Medicine is a "multi-disciplinary nonprofit association that promotes innovation, development, and application of magnetic resonance techniques in medicine and biology throughout the world".

The Society has over 9000 members and is based in Concord, California, USA.

See also
List of International Society for Magnetic Resonance in Medicine gold medal winners

References

Magnetic resonance imaging
Organizations based in California
International medical associations